The Rewards for Justice Program (RFJ) is the counterterrorism and counterintelligence  platform administered by the U.S. Department of State's Diplomatic Security Service agency. The Rewards For Justice program is seeking information leading to the arrest, capture, and identification or location of any foreign person, including a foreign entity, who knowingly engaged or is engaging in foreign election interference, as well as information leading to the prevention, frustration, or favorable resolution of an act of foreign election interference. The Rewards for Justice Program has paid more than $250 million to 125 individuals for leading information that prevented international terrorist attacks or helped bring to justice those involved in prior acts.

History

The program was established by the 1984 Act to Combat International Terrorism (Public Law 98-533), and it is administered by the U.S. State Department's Bureau of Diplomatic Security. The Rewards for Justice Program was formerly known as the Counter-Terror Rewards Program, soon shortened to the HEROES program. In 1993, DS launched www.heroes.net to help publicize reward information. Brad Smith, a Diplomatic Security Service (DSS) special agent assigned to desk duty due to illness, served as the lone site administrator and program manager running the operation from his home. By 1997, the site was getting more than one million hits a year from 102 countries. Smith is also credited with the idea to put photos of wanted terrorists on matchbook covers. DSS agents assigned to embassies and consulates throughout the world ensured that the matchbooks got wide distribution at bars and restaurants.

The Director of the Diplomatic Security Service chairs an interagency committee which reviews reward candidates and then recommends rewards to the Secretary of State. The committee includes members from the staff of the White House National Security Council, Central Intelligence Agency, Department of Justice, Department of Defense, Department of Homeland Security, Department of the Treasury, and the U.S. Department of State.

After the September 11 attacks, the list of wanted terrorists increased dramatically, and rewards were also increased, as part of the U.S. efforts to capture al-Qaeda leadership. However, the plan has been largely ineffective against Islamic terrorists. The largest reward offered was $25 million for the leader of al-Qaeda, Osama bin Laden, which had "attracted hundreds of anonymous calls but no reliable leads." Osama bin Laden was shot and killed inside a private residential compound in Abbottabad, Pakistan, by members of the United States Naval Special Warfare Development Group and Central Intelligence Agency operatives in a covert operation on May 1, 2011.

Robert A. Hartung, Assistant Director of Diplomatic Security's Threat Investigations and Analysis Directorate, announced on September 2, 2010 that the U.S. Department of State's Rewards for Justice program is offering rewards of up to $5 million each for information that leads law enforcement or security forces to Hakimullah Mehsud and Wali ur Rehman. Former U.S. Secretary of State Hillary Clinton presented a list of "the five most wanted terrorists" to Pakistan; the list included Ayman al-Zawahiri, Mohammed Omar, Ilyas Kashmiri, Atiyah Abd al-Rahman and Sirajuddin Haqqani. Each of these five had bounties issued against them by the program; however, Kashmiri, who US Intelligence officials said they were 99% sure was killed in an airstrike in South Waziristan on June 3, 2011, was removed from the list. Rahman was killed in an airstrike in North Waziristan in August 2011. Omar died of tuberculosis in Karachi, Pakistan in April 2013. Al-Zawahiri was killed in a drone strike in Kabul, Afghanistan in July 2022.

On December 22, 2011, Rewards for Justice announced a reward of up to $10 million for information leading to Ezedin Abdel Aziz Khalil (aka Yasin al-Suri), the leader of an al-Qaeda fundraising network in Iran that transfers money and recruits via Iranian territory to Pakistan and Afghanistan. It marked the first time that Rewards for Justice offered a reward for information leading to a terrorist financier.

In April 2020, Rewards for Justice Program offered $5 million for information leading to identify North Korean hackers threatening the United States.

See also
 Diplomatic Security Service
 FBI Most Wanted Terrorists
 Narcotics Reward Program

References

External links

 
 Bureau of Diplomatic Security description
 Factsheet (August 15, 2002) from the U.S. Department of State
 Diplomatic Security Service announces $5 million dollar reward
 Briefing of USG efforts to disrupt and dismantle Tehrik-e Taliban Pakistan (TTP) (September 1, 2010)
 U.S. Diplomatic Security

1984 establishments in the United States
Bureau of Diplomatic Security
Counterterrorism
Counterterrorism in the United States